The 2023 World Figure Skating Championships will be held in Saitama, Japan from March 22–26, 2023. The competition will determine the entry quotas for each federation at the 2024 World Championships.

Qualification

Age and minimum TES requirements 
Skaters will be eligible for the 2023 World Championships if they turned 15 years of age before July 1, 2022, and if they met the minimum technical elements score requirements. The ISU accepts scores if they were obtained at senior-level ISU-recognized international competitions during the ongoing season at least 21 days before the first official practice day of the championships or during the preceding season.

Number of entries per discipline 
Based on the results of the 2022 World Championships, each ISU member nation can field one to three entries per discipline. China did not participate due to COVID-19 protocols, and may only field one entry. Additionally, Russia and Belarus currently remain suspended following the 2022 Russian invasion of Ukraine.

Entries
Member nations began announcing their selections in December 2022. The International Skating Union published a complete list of entries on February 28, 2023.

Changes to preliminary entries

Medal summary

Medalists
Medals awarded to the skaters who achieve the highest overall placements in each discipline:

Small medals awarded to the skaters who achieve the highest short program or rhythm dance placements in each discipline:

Small medals awarded to the skaters who achieve the highest free skating or free dance placements in each discipline:

Medals by country
Table of medals for overall placement:

Table of small medals for placement in the short/rhythm segment:

Table of small medals for placement in the free segment:

Results

Men

Women

Pairs

Ice dance

References

External links 
 World Championships at the International Skating Union
 Results

World Figure Skating Championships
2023 World Figure Skating Championships
World Figure Skating Championships
2023 in Japanese sport
March 2023 sports events in Japan
Sport in Saitama (city)
World Figure Skating Championships